Parking Lot Symphony is the eleventh recording overall by American jazz musician Troy "Trombone Shorty" Andrews and his first studio album on Blue Note Records. The album was produced by Chris Seefried (Andra Day, Fitz and the Tantrums) and was released on April 28, 2017 as a follow up to Say That to Say This (2013). It reached number 1 on the Billboard Jazz Albums Chart on May 20 and spent 31 weeks on the chart.

Track listing

Personnel
Troy 'Trombone Shorty' Andrews – trombone, lead vocals, background vocals, trumpet, piano, organ, drums, glockenspiel, guitar
Pete Murano – guitar
Tony Hall – bass guitar
Joey Peebles – drums
Dan Oestreicher – baritone saxophone
BK Jackson – tenor saxophone

Additional Musicians
Ivan Neville – piano on "Here Come The Girls"
Leo Nocentelli – acoustic guitar on "It Ain’t No Use"
Chris Seefried – sitar guitar, piano, mellotron, glockenspiel
Ramon Islas – percussion on "It Ain't No Use" and "Here Come The Girls"
Glenn Hall – electric piano on "Laveau Dirge Finale"
Juan Covarrubias – synthesizer on "Familiar"
Paul Cartwright – viola, violin on "Parking Lot Symphony" 
Tracey Lee  – choir 
Chrishira Perrier – choir 
Remonda Davis – choir 
Raion Ramsey – choir 
Ashley Watson – choir 
Lonel Simmons – choir 
Ashley Doucett – choir 
Sabrina Hayes – choir 
India Favorite – choir 
Faith Mack – choir

Production
Chris Seefried – producer, arranger, mixing
Troy 'Trombone Shorty' Andrews – arranger
Seth Atkins Horan – engineer, mixer
Bernie Grundman – mastering
Mathieu Bitton – photography
Paul Moore – design

Year-end charts

References

Trombone Shorty albums
2017 albums